Bente Sandvig is a Norwegian politician who was party secretary of the Socialist Left Party from 1989 to 1993. She is from 1993 employed in Norwegian Humanist Association and leader of the Council for Religious and Life Stance Communities from 2007 to 2011.

References 

Living people
Socialist Left Party (Norway) politicians
Year of birth missing (living people)